Robert Ruohtula (15 November 1853, in Kuhmoinen – 8 May 1914) was a Finnish farmer and politician. He was a member of the Parliament of Finland from 1911 to 1913, representing the Finnish Party.

References

1853 births
1914 deaths
People from Kuhmoinen
People from Häme Province (Grand Duchy of Finland)
Finnish Party politicians
Members of the Parliament of Finland (1911–13)